Spider-Ham: Caught in a Ham (also simply known as Caught in a Ham) is a 2019 American animated superhero short film featuring the Marvel Comics character Spider-Ham and produced by Sony Pictures Animation. Directed and written by Miguel Jiron, it is a prequel to the 2018 film Spider-Man: Into the Spider-Verse, and was released as a special feature on that film's digital release on February 26, 2019, and as part of the film's Blu-ray and DVD releases on March 19. John Mulaney reprises his role as Spider-Ham from the film, moments before he entered a portal into the Spider-Verse.

On September 20, 2019, Caught in a Ham was officially released on YouTube by Marvel HQ under license from Sony Pictures Animation.

Plot
As Spider-Ham is about to enjoy a hot dog, he finds himself kidnapped by Doctor Crawdaddy. Through fast thinking and criticism of Doctor Crawdaddy's chosen moniker, Spider-Ham manages to defeat the villain and escape. While walking away, Spider-Ham is swallowed in by a portal taking him directly into an alternative dimension. As the short ends, the hot dog pops out of the portal.

Cast
 John Mulaney as Spider-Ham
 Aaron LaPlante as Doctor Crawdaddy

Production
Following the successful release of Spider-Man: Into the Spider-Verse in December, producers Phil Lord and Christopher Miller said they were planning to produce two additional Spider-Man-themed animated features to go along with the original film's Blu-ray and digital releases. The pair also expressed their interest in creating a Spider-Ham short film, with Phil stating that he wanted to "spin-off the Spider-Ham cinematic television universe. One thing at a time." Later that same month, producers Amy Pascal and Avi Arad also mentioned their interest in making a spin-off film based on the character. Following talk about the potential spin-off and John Mulaney's pitch for a Spider-Ham movie, the project was confirmed by Sony Pictures Animation on February 18, 2019.

Reception
The short film was highly praised by critics. Mike Phalin, writing for ScienceFiction.com, said the short was "pretty good", expressing that "Sony’s version of Spider-Ham [was] a bit of a cross between Chuck Jones's  and Daffy Duck under director Bob Clampett." Ashley Robinson, writing for Major Spoilers, complimented the imagery presented in the short as well as John Mulaney's voice acting in the film.

References

External links
 
 Spider-Ham: Caught in a Ham on YouTube
 Spider-Ham: Caught in a Ham at Sony Pictures Animation

2019 short films
Sony Pictures Animation short films
Spider-Man films
Short films based on Marvel Comics
Animated short films based on comics
Spider-Verse (franchise)
2010s English-language films
Films about pigs
2010s American films